Anton Sergeyevich Korolyov (born 26 January 1988) is a Russian professional ice hockey player. He is currently an unrestricted free agent who was most recently under contract with Admiral Vladivostok of the Kontinental Hockey League (KHL).

Korolyov played with HC Vityaz Podolsk of the KHL during the 2012–13 season.

References

External links

1988 births
Living people
Admiral Vladivostok players
Russian ice hockey right wingers
Ice hockey people from Moscow
SKA Saint Petersburg players
HC Vityaz players
HC Yugra players